August Banščak (born 10 October 1911, date of death unknown) was a Yugoslav hurdler. He competed in the men's 400 metres hurdles at the 1936 Summer Olympics.

References

External links

1911 births
Year of death missing
Athletes (track and field) at the 1936 Summer Olympics
Yugoslav male hurdlers
Serbian male hurdlers
Olympic athletes of Yugoslavia
Sportspeople from Pančevo